Greta Simone Kline (born March 21, 1994), formerly known by the stage name Frankie Cosmos, is an American musician and singer-songwriter. She is known for her independent releases, inspired by Frank O'Hara's poetry, DIY ethics of K Records and the early 2000s New York City's anti-folk scene. She is the daughter of actors Kevin Kline and Phoebe Cates. Her former stage name "Frankie Cosmos" is now the name of her band.

Early life
Kline was born on March 21, 1994, in New York City, the daughter of Academy Award-winning actor Kevin Kline and actress Phoebe Cates. Her father is of German-Jewish and Irish descent and her mother has Russian-Jewish and Chinese-Filipino ancestry. She has one older brother, Owen Kline, who is an actor and filmmaker.

Kline was introduced to music by her family. She settled on guitar as her primary instrument of choice at seventh grade, after playing the piano and briefly the drums. Home-schooled for most of high school, she spent time by attending underground rock shows in New York and getting involved in the Westchester music scene. Kline  attended New York University's Gallatin School of Individualized Study for two years, and studied English and/or poetry. Kline found the school to be unaccommodating of her touring schedule, and dropped out.

Kline and her brother Owen both appeared in the films The Anniversary Party (2001) and The Squid and the Whale (2005).

Career
Kline started performing and recording independently under the alias Ingrid Superstar. She released a number of lo-fi recordings mainly under her Bandcamp account. In early 2010s, she was also introduced to the music community of Purchase College, which introduced her to independent Double Double Whammy record label. In late 2011, she started to perform under the alias Frankie Cosmos, a name coined by her now ex-boyfriend Aaron Maine of the band Porches. Maine played drums for Frankie Cosmos and Kline played bass for Porches at one point in time.

In 2014, Kline released her debut studio album as Frankie Cosmos, Zentropy, with her backing band.

Kline released the EP Fit Me In on November 13, 2015, on Bayonet Records.
Kline released her second studio album, Next Thing, on April 1, 2016, on Bayonet Records.

On April 12, 2017, Frankie Cosmos announced a slew of tour dates and that they recently had signed to Sub Pop records. They stated around this time that they are working on a new album. On June 9, 2017, Kline opened for IAN SWEET and Girlpool at Warsaw in Brooklyn as part of her new project Lexie. Joined by Warehouse members Alex Bailey and Doug Bleichner, their first release is on Bandcamp and it is called "Record Time!".

In January 2018, Kline released the lead single "Jesse" from the album Vessel. The album was released on March 30, 2018, through Sub Pop records. On March 13, 2019, Kline released "Haunted Items", featuring just herself on vocals and piano. The band Frankie Cosmos released their fourth studio album, Close It Quietly on September 6, 2019.

Two of Kline's songs, "Fool" and "The End", were both showcased during two episodes on the Netflix drama series Hilda (TV series). Her song "Sappho" was also featured in Heartstopper (TV series) for its queer nature.

Throughout the first few months of quarantine, Kline did weekly Instagram livestream performances.

On August 2, 2022 the band announced their new album, Inner World Peace via Subpop.

Backing bands

"Frankie Cosmos"
 Luke Pyenson – drums, vocals
 Alex Bailey – bass guitar, keyboards 
 Lauren Martin – keyboards, synthesizers, harmonies

Members of earlier backing bands
 Ronnie Mystery (Aaron Maine) – drums, vocals
 Gabby Teardrop (Gabrielle Smith) - keyboards, synthesizers, harmonies
 David Mystery (David Maine) – bass guitar, keyboards

Discography

Studio albums
 Zentropy (2014)
 Next Thing (2016)
 Vessel (2018)
 Close It Quietly (2019)
 Inner World Peace (2022)

EPs
 Fit Me In (2015)
 Haunted Items (2019) (series of four digital EPs)

Bandcamp exclusives
 sickerwinter (2012)
 birth of penis (2012)
 separation anxiety (2012)
 thanks for everything (2012)
 woodchip arthur and his sweaty palms (2012)
 LOSING (2012)
 Wobbling (2013)
 moss (2013)
 why am i underwater? (2013)
 DADDY COOL (2013)
 im sorry im hi lets go (2013)
 pure suburb (2013)
 donutes (2014)
 affirms glinting (2014)
 quick songs (2014)

As franz charcoal
 great scraps (2020)

As Ingrid Superstar
 adventures (2009)
 amnesia the fifth (2011)
 songs about HIM (2011)
 i'mall fuced up (2011)
 Collaborative Farting (2011)
 brown cow chockmilk (patterns) (2011)
 Sunrise Over Interpositioned Buildings (2011)
 suckups vs. lovers (2011)
 shit about fuck (2011)
 the landlord LOVES restaurants! (2011)
 Couch Potato (2011)
 Jared Leto Can't Read (2011)
 Do you KNow my Friend JOM (2011)
 No Can Do (2011)
 sunshine over intertwined feelings (2011)

As Greta
 Songs I Made. Hi (2011)
 Kaleidescoping (2012)

As Ingrid
 ingrid you've done it again (2011)
 in yr dreams (2011)
 sMartyr (2011)
 yellow single (2011)
 long thin monster single (2011)

As Little Bear
 He Is Risen: DANK (2011)

As The Ingrates
 and it made me cry for a long time and i dont like crying (2011)
 The Artist Formerly Known As Ingrid (2011)
 rings left by cups on black tables (2011)

As Zebu Fur
 telescoping (2011)
 i'm bad news (2011)
 skinned elbow = now you're cool (2011)
 i've never been in love before baby, pretend i'm slick (2011)

As Franklin Cosmos
 much ado about fucking (2012)

As Frankie Cosmos and the Emptiness
 love rind (2013)
 told you so (2013)

Singles
 Owen (2014)
 Birthday Song (2014)
 Sinister (2016)
 Is It Possible/Sleep Song (2016)
 On The Lips (2016)
 Jesse (2018)
 Being Alive (2018)
 Apathy (2018)
 Windows (2019)
 Rings On A Tree (2019)
 Wannago (2019)
 Slide, split release with Lomelda (2021)
 One Year Stand (2022)
 Aftershook (2022)
 F.O.O.F. (2022)
 Empty Head (2022)

Music videos
 "Joe Joe (Boys Are Dogs)" (2012; dir. BJ Rubin)
 "Art School" (2014; dir. Sophia Bennett Holmes)
 "embody" (2014)
 "Korean Food" (2016; dir. Greta Kline)
 "Is It Possible / Sleep Song" (2016)
 "Young" (2016; dir. Eliza Doyle)
 "Being Alive" (2018; dir. Daniel Martin)
 "Jesse" (2018; dir. Loroto and Frankie Cosmos)
 "Apathy" (2018; dir. Tom Scharpling)
"Duet" (2018; dir. Eliza Doyle)
"Windows" (2019; dir. Eliza Doyle and Greta Kline)
"Wannago" (2019; dir. Robert Kolodny)

Filmography
 The Anniversary Party (2001) 
 The Squid and the Whale (2005)

References

External links
 

1994 births
21st-century American singers
21st-century American women singers
American women guitarists
American women rock singers
American women singer-songwriters
American folk guitarists
American folk singers
American indie pop musicians
American indie rock musicians
American multi-instrumentalists
American musicians of Chinese descent
American musicians of Filipino descent
American people of German-Jewish descent
American people of Irish descent
American people of Russian-Jewish descent
American rock bass guitarists
American rock songwriters
Women bass guitarists
Guitarists from New York City
Jewish American musicians
Jewish women singers
Jewish anti-folk musicians
Jewish rock musicians
Living people
New York University Gallatin School of Individualized Study alumni
Singer-songwriters from New York (state)
21st-century American bass guitarists
Sub Pop artists
21st-century American Jews
Women punk rock singers